Stephen Meade is an American Business Executive, strategic adviser and entrepreneur.  He has created and ran three Public OTC companies in the US and has started 11 total companies.  He took his first company public in 1999 which was a precursor to PayPal.  Currently, Stephen serves as the Chairman at BigBamboo LLC, a holding company that incubates start-up companies and is also head of MonetaPro, MagMo, My Wet Rock, RONAstar and ComCom (Community Commerce) Networks. He founded FOMOEX with David Hung.

Career
Stephen graduated from the University of Missouri–Kansas City with a bachelor's degree in Business and Marketing. By the age of 21, he had written three books on credit improvement and finance, and an infomercial called "Give Yourself Credit". He then spent 6 years in financial services and in 1996, started his first internet company called Virtual Sellers which became an innovation for an e-commerce based transaction processing system that proved to be an early precursor to PayPal.

Stephen also hosts a podcast titled The BullsEye Guy Podcast.

Stephen Meade is particularly notable for his contributions to technology-based companies including:

2Xchange
2Xchange: Chicago based software company specializing in asset management and redeployment technologies. 2Xchange is best known for having developed, implemented, and powered the software behind the Emergency Asset Management System platform.

Virtual Sellers
VirtualSellers as the first Internet based master merchant for eCommerce in 1996.  Meade helped develop a transaction processing systems for internet based retailers. The VirtualSellerc was sold in 1999 to a public company that assumed the name of Virtualsellers.com. The company provided up to 7 payment options, and easy transaction processing and clearing services for small and medium businesses looking to sell their products online.

Cenoplex
An audio messaging and services company that helps carriers in Lifecycle Management (LCM) efforts to reduce churn, promote Value Added Services (VAS), and increase Revenue (ARPU) with non-intrusive audio content.  Fully funded, with an A+ Management team and Advisory Board, Cenoplex is the first company in the world to insert a four-second audio message in the call sequencing gap of an outbound mobile call, all without disrupting the call path. Developed "Actionable Audio Messages" technology, a wireless audio advertising platform and insertion engine for mobile operators.

Community Commerce Networks
Community Commerce Networks (ComCom) is a closed loop and private labeled transaction system for affinity groups.

OrionNation
OrionNation is an "anti-Facebook" site for entertainers looking to control their own content.

RONAStar: Enterprise
RONAStar Enterprise solution "empowering large corporations to save money by redeploying idle assets".

KnockNOW
In August 2000, Meade and former government commissioner, Bob Gerometta, founded KnockNOW, a non-profit organization committed to accelerating opportunities for entrepreneurs. Meade and Gerometta wanted to educate and support a community professionals from five key business sectors: service; politics, press and academics; investment; corporate; and entrepreneurial.  Today, the KnockNOW community continues to hold regular meetings called "Isolation is a Good Thing".

Big Bamboo
Big Bamboo, LLC is a holding company and incubator for start-up companies.  Stephen serves as business architect, venture capitalist, and relationship builder.

My WetRock
My WetRock is a consumer product that saves a targeted 20 billions of gallons of water per year by reducing the amount of wasted water when flushing toilets. At My WetRock, Meade promotes environmental awareness and provides creative educational tools through a comic character called "Johnny Waterdrop". In March 2011, Meade was named TCVN's FastPitch Winner for his work with My WetRock.

MonetaPro
MonetaPro is a B2B platform that operates as a sell-for-credit exchange. MonetaPro allows companies to list goods and services for sale at prices they determine. With MonetaPro, businesses can freely buy and sell goods and services to other businesses across all vertical markets & industries.  To date, MonetaPro has won 8 global contests.

- February 19, 2018: d10e (Silicon Valley) - 1st Place

- March 6, 2018: d10e (Korea) - 3rd Place

- March 15, 2018: d10e (Puerto Rico) - 4th Place

- April 5, 2018: CryptoBlockcon (Los Angeles) - 1st Place in ICO competition

- May 21, 2018: d10e (Malta) - 2nd Place

- July 18, 2018: CoinAgenda Europe - 3rd Place

FOMOEX
Stephen Meade founded FOMOEX with David Hung, where he serves as the Chairman.

Leadership
Stephen has been a global panel moderator, expert speaker and keynote speaker around the world.  He has served as a mentor to the Founder Institute, world's largest entrepreneur training and startup launch program. Meade is also noted for his active participation in the Clinton Global Initiative and Opportunity Green.

Meade has stood as guest lecturer at several universities, including MIT, Harvard, USC, UCLA, Northwestern and Peter Kiewit Institute among others.

References

Living people
American businesspeople
Technology company founders
Year of birth missing (living people)